Krachia cossmanni is a species of sea snail, a gastropod in the family Cerithiopsidae, which is known from European waters, including the United Kingdom Exclusive Economic Zone. It was described by Dautzenberg and Fischer H., in 1896.

Distribution
This marine species occurs in European waters found at bathyal depths off the Azores, Iceland, the  Faroes and Southern Norway

Description
The length of the shall attains 6 mm.
.

References

 Dautzenberg P. & Fischer H., 1896: Dragages effectués par l'Hirondelle et par la Princesse Alice 1888-1895. 1. Mollusques Gastropodes ; Mémoires de la Société Zoologique de France 9: 395-498, pl. 15-22

External links
 

Cerithiopsidae
Gastropods described in 1896